BBBP may refer to:
 Beti Bachao, Beti Padhao, a campaign of the Government of India to save and educate the girl child
 Bad Bitches Bang Pink, a mixtape by rapper Jacki-O
 Bronx Blue Bedroom Project, alternative art project by artist Blanka Amezkua